In geology, the petrosphere is the entire silicate portion of a planet, including its crust and mantle.

References

See also 

 Lithosphere

Geology